Clytie, or Clytia is a water nymph, daughter of the Titans Oceanus and Tethys in Greek mythology. She is thus one of the 3,000 Oceanid nymphs, and sister to the 3,000 Potamoi (the river-gods).

According to the myth, Clytie loved the god of the sun Helios in vain, but he left her for another woman, the princess Leucothoe, under the influence of Aphrodite, the goddess of love. In anger and bitterness, she revealed their affair to the girl's father, indirectly causing her doom as the king buried her alive. This failed to win Helios back to her, and she was left lovingly staring at him from the ground; eventually she turned into a heliotrope, a violet flower that gazes at the Sun in its diurnal journey.

Clytie's story is mostly known from and fully preserved in Ovid's narrative poem Metamorphoses, though other brief accounts and references to her from other authors survive as well.

Etymology 
Her name, spelled both Klytie and Klytia, is derived from the ancient Greek adjective , meaning "glorious" or "renowned". It derives from the verb , meaning 'to hear, to understand', itself from the Proto-Indo-European root *ḱlew-, which means 'to hear'.

Mythology

Ovid 
Ovid's account of the story is the fullest and most detailed of the surviving ones. According to him, Clytie was a lover of Helios, until Aphrodite made him fall in love with a Persian mortal princess, Leucothoe, in order to take revenge on him for telling her husband Hephaestus of her affair with the god of war Ares, whereupon he ceased to care for her and all the other goddesses he had loved before, like Rhodos, Perse and Clymene. Helios, having loved her, abandoned her for Leucothoe and left her deserted. Now no longer loved by him, she "scorned by [Helios], still seeks [his] love and even now bears its deep wounds in her heart." Angered by his treatment of her, and still missing him, she informed Leucothoe's father, King Orchamus, about the affair. Since Helios had defiled Leucothoe, Orchamus had her put to death by burial alive in the sands. Helios arrived too late to save the girl, but he did make sure to turn her into a frankincense tree by pouring nectar over her dead body, so that she would still breathe air (in a way). Ovid seems to think that Helios bears some responsibility over Clytie's excessive jealousy because he writes that Helios's passion was never "moderate" when he loved her.

Clytie intended to win Helios back by taking away his new love, but even though "her love might make excuse of grief, and grief may plead to pardon jealous words" her actions only hardened his heart against her, and now he avoided her altogether, never going back to her. In despair, she stripped herself and sat naked, accepting neither food nor drink, for nine days on the rocks, staring at the sun, Helios, and mourning his departure, but he never looked back at her. After nine days she was eventually transformed into a purple flower, the heliotrope (meaning "sun-turning"), also known as turnsole (which is known for growing on sunny, rocky hillsides), which turns its head always to look longingly at Helios the Sun as he passes through the sky in his solar chariot, even though he no longer cares for her, her form much changed, her love for him unchanged.

Variations 

The episode is most fully told by Roman poet Ovid in his poem the Metamorphoses; Ovid's version is the only full surviving narrative of this story, but he must had had a Greek original source, for the myth's origins and plot lie in the etymology of the flower's Greek name. According to Lactantius Placidus, he got this myth from seventh or sixth century BC Greek author Hesiod. Some scholars however doubt this particular attribution to Hesiod. Like Ovid, Lactantius does not explain how Clytie knew about Helios and Leucothoe, or how Helios knew it was Clytie who had informed Orchamus. It is possible that originally the stories of Leucothoe and Clytie were two distinct ones before they were combined along with a third story, that of Ares and Aphrodite's affair being discovered by Helios who then informed Hephaestus, into a single one either by Ovid or Ovid's source.

One of the ancient paradoxographers identifies the girl who betrayed the secret as Leucothoe's sister instead, and their father's name as Orchomenus, giving her neither a name nor a motivation behind her actions. Orchomenus is also the name of a town in Boeotia, implying that this version of the story took place there rather than Persia. Pliny the Elder wrote that:

I have spoken more than once of the marvel of heliotropium, which turns round with the sun even on a cloudy day, so great a love it has for that, luminary. At night it closes its blue flower as though it mourned.

Edith Hamilton notes that Clytie's case is unique in Greek mythology, as instead of the typical lovesick god being in love with an unwilling maiden, it is a maiden who is in love with an unwilling god.

Culture 
Similar to the story of Daphne used as an explanation for the plant's prominence in worship, Clytie' story might have been used for similar purposes in connecting the flower she turned into, the heliotrope, to Helios.

An ancient scholiast wrote that the heliotropium that Clytie was turned into was the first preservation of the love for the god.

Modern interpretations

Identity of the flower 

Modern traditions substitute the purple turnsole with a yellow sunflower, which according to (incorrect) folk wisdom turns in the direction of the sun. The original French form tournesol primarily refers to sunflower, while the English turnsole is primarily used for heliotrope. Sunflowers however are native to North America, and were not found in antiquity in either Greece or Italy, making it impossible for ancient Greek and Roman authors to have included them in their etiological myths, as sunflowers were not part of their native flora and they would have not known about them and their sun-turning properties.

It has also been noted that the heliotropium itself poses some difficulties for identification with Clytie's flower; heliotropium arborescens, which is the vivid purple variant, is not native to Europe either, instead coming from the Americas just like the aforementioned sunflower. Native variants of heliotropium or other flowers called "heliotrope" are also the wrong colour, either white (heliotropium supinum) or yellow (vilossum), when Ovid described it as "like a violet" and Pliny "blue". Both however lived in the post-Hellenistic period after the conquests of Alexander the Great, and could have been aware of the heliotropium indicum, a variant that can have a purplish or bluish corolla. Moreover, even heliotropium europaeum, a variant native in Europe which is normally white in colour, can have pale lilac flowers.

Identity of the god 
Much like with Phaethon, another ancient myth featuring Helios, some modern retellings connect Clytie and her story to Apollo, the god of light, but the myth as attested in classical sources does not actually concern him; Ovid identifies twice the god Clytie fell in love with as Hyperione natus/e (the son of Hyperion), and like other Roman authors does not conflate in his poem the two gods, who remain distinct in myth. Clytie's lover whom she was jilted by is also connected to the story of Phaethon, as the boy's father, a distinctly solar but non-Apolline figure, who in turn is not a sun god or given any solar characteristics as far as Ovid is concerned. Joseph Fontenrose argued that despite Ovid's works being largely responsible for the prevalence of the two gods being the same one in post-classical times, he himself did not actually identify them in either the story of Phaethon or the story of Leucothoe and Clytie.

Art

Bust (Townley collection) 
One sculpture of Clytie, found in the collection of Charles Townley, might be either a Roman work, or an eighteenth century "fake".

The bust was created between 40 and 50 AD. Townley acquired it from the family of the principe Laurenzano in Naples during his extended second Grand Tour of Italy (1771–1774); the Laurenzano insisted it had been found locally. It remained a favorite both with him (it figures prominently in Johann Zoffany's iconic painting of Townley's library (illustration, right), was one of three ancient marbles Townley had reproduced on his visiting card, and was apocryphally the one which he wished he could carry with him when his house was torched in the Gordon Riots – apocryphal since the bust is in fact far too heavy for that) and with the public (Joseph Nollekens is said to have always had a marble copy of it in stock for his customers to purchase, and in the late 19th century Parian ware copies were all the rage.

The identity of the subject, a woman emerging from a calyx of leaves, was much discussed among the antiquaries in Townley's circle. At first referred to as Agrippina, and later called by Townley Isis in a lotus flower, it is now accepted as Clytie. Some modern scholars even claim the bust is of eighteenth century date, though most now think it is an ancient work showing Antonia Minor or a contemporaneous Roman lady in the guise of Ariadne.

Bust (George Frederick Watts) 

Another famous bust of Clytie was by George Frederick Watts. Instead of Townley's serene Clytie, Watts's is straining, looking round at the sun.

Literature 
Clytie is briefly alluded to in Thomas Hood's poem Flowers, in the lines "I will not have the mad Clytie,/Whose head is turned by the sun;". William Blake's poem Ah! Sun-flower has been suggested to allude to the myth of Clytie.

The sunflower (which was not Clytie's original flower) ever since her myth, has "been an emblem of the faithful subject", in three or four ways: the "image of a soul devoted to the god or God, originally a Platonic concept", as "an image of the Virgin devoted to Christ"; or "an image - in the strictly Ovidian sense - of the lover devoted to the beloved". Northrop Frye claimed that Clytie's metamorphosis tale is at the 'core' of the poem.

Gallery

Genealogy

See also 

 73 Klytia, a main-belt asteroid named after this nymph.
 Smilax, another nymph transformed into a plant over love. 
 Mecon, a goddess' lover who was transformed into a flower.
 Psalacantha, another nymph transformed into a flower for trying to separate a god from his mortal lover.
 Heliotrope (color)
 Acantha

Footnotes

Notes

References

Primary sources 

 Hesiod, Theogony, in The Homeric Hymns and Homerica with an English Translation by Hugh G. Evelyn-White, Cambridge, MA., Harvard University Press; London, William Heinemann Ltd. 1914. Online version at the Perseus Digital Library.
 Hyginus, Gaius Julius, The Myths of Hyginus. Edited and translated by Mary A. Grant, Lawrence: University of Kansas Press, 1960.
 Lateinische Mythographen: Lactantius Placidus, Argumente der Metamorphosen Ovids, erstes heft, Dr. B. Bunte, Bremen, 1852, J. Kühtmann & Comp.
 Paradoxographoe, by Anton Westermann, Harvard College Library, 1839, London.
 Pliny the Elder, The Natural History, Books 1-11, translated by John Bostock (1773-1846), M.D., F.R.S. Henry T. Riley (1816-1878), Esq., B.A. London. Taylor and Francis, Red Lion Court, Fleet Street, first published 1855. Online text available at topos.text.
 Publii Ovidii Nasonis Opera omnia: IV. voluminibus comprehensa : cum integris Jacobi Micylli, Herculis Ciofani, et Danielis Heinsii notis, et Nicolai Heinsii curis secundis, et aliorum singulas partes, partim integris, parti excerptis, adnotationibus, vol. II. Google books.
 Publius Ovidius Naso, Metamorphoses. Hugo Magnus. Gotha (Germany). Friedr. Andr. Perthes. 1892. Latin text available at the Perseus Digital Library.
 Publis Ovidius Naso. Metamorphoses, Volume I: Books 1-8. Translated by Frank Justus Miller. Revised by G. P. Goold. Loeb Classical Library No. 42. Cambridge, Massachusetts: Harvard University Press, 1977, first published 1916. . Online version at Harvard University Press.

Secondary sources 

 
 Berens, E. M., The Myths and Legends of Ancient Greece and Rome, Blackie & Son, Old Bailey, E.C., Glasgow, Endinburgh and Dublin. 1880.
  
 Bulfinch, Thomas, Greek and Roman Mythology: The Age of Fable, Dover Publications, 2000, unabridged, .
 Cameron, Alan, Greek Mythography in the Roman World, Oxford University Press, 2004, . Google books.
 
 Folkard, Richard (1884), Plant Lore, Legends, and Lyrics: Embracing the Myths, Traditions, Superstitions, and Folk-Lore of the Plant Kingdom, Folkard & Son. 
 
 Gantz, Timothy, Early Greek Myth: A Guide to Literary and Artistic Sources, Johns Hopkins University Press, 1996, Two volumes:  (Vol. 1),  (Vol. 2).
 
 Grimal, Pierre, A Concise Dictionary of Classical Mythology, Wiley-Blackwell, 1990. .
 
 Hard, Robin, The Routledge Handbook of Greek Mythology: Based on H.J. Rose's "Handbook of Greek Mythology", Psychology Press, 2004, . Google Books.
 Keith, William J (1966). "The complexities of Blake's "Sunflower" : an archetypal speculation". In Northrop Frye (ed.). Blake: a collection of critical essays. Englewood Cliffs: Prentice-Hall.
 
 MacDonald Kirkwood Gordon, A Short Guide to Classical Mythology. Cornell University. 2000. Bolchazy-Carducci Publishers, Inc, . Google books
 March, Jennifer R., Dictionary of Classical Mythology. Illustrations by Neil Barrett, Cassel & Co., 1998. .
 Parada, Carlos, Genealogical Guide to Greek Mythology, Jonsered, Paul Åströms Förlag, 1993. .
 Seyffert, Oskar, A Dictionary of Classical Antiquities, Mythology, Religion, Literature and Art, from the German of Dr. Oskar Seyffert, S. Sonnenschein, 1901.
 Tripp, Edward, Crowell's Handbook of Classical Mythology, Thomas Y. Crowell Co; First edition (June 1970). .

External links 

 Images of Clytie in the Warburg Institute Iconographic Database
 CLYTIE from The Theoi Project
 CLYTIE from greekmythology.com
 PLANTS & FLOWERS OF GREEK MYTHOLOGY on the Theoi Project

Oceanids
Greek goddesses
Sea and river goddesses
Metamorphoses characters
Women of Helios
Archaeological discoveries in Italy
Townley collection
Love stories
Helios in mythology
Boeotian mythology
Metamorphoses into flowers in Greek mythology
Heliotropium
Princesses in Greek mythology